During the 1999–2000 English football season, Coventry City competed in the FA Premier League (known as the FA Carling Premiership for sponsorship reasons).

Season summary
Coventry City were one of the Premiership's best-performing sides at home during 1999–2000, achieving 12 victories at the Highfield Road stadium. However, they failed to win a single away game all season, ruining their hopes of getting anywhere near the top five, and they were restricted to 14th place in the final table. 1999–2000 also marked the end of 43-year-old goalkeeper Steve Ogrizovic's illustrious career at the club, and severed their final remaining link with the 1987 FA Cup winning side. Robbie Keane proved a successful signing with 12 goals in 34 league appearances.

Final league table

Results summary

Results by round

Results
Coventry City's score comes first

Legend

FA Premier League

FA Cup

League Cup

First-team squad
Squad at end of season

Left club during season

Reserve squad
The following players did not appear for the first-team this season.

Transfers

In

Out

Transfers in:  £15,450,000
Transfers out:  £9,600,000
Total spending:  £5,850,000

Statistics

Appearances and goals

|-
! colspan=14 style=background:#dcdcdc; text-align:center| Goalkeepers

|-
! colspan=14 style=background:#dcdcdc; text-align:center| Defenders

|-
! colspan=14 style=background:#dcdcdc; text-align:center| Midfielders

|-
! colspan=14 style=background:#dcdcdc; text-align:center| Forwards

|-
! colspan=14 style=background:#dcdcdc; text-align:center| Players transferred or loaned out during the season

|-

References

Coventry City F.C. seasons
Coventry City